Tabon Man refers to remains discovered in the Tabon Caves in Lipuun Point in Quezon, Palawan in the Philippines. They were discovered by Robert B. Fox, an American anthropologist of the National Museum of the Philippines, on May 28, 1962. These remains, the fossilized fragments of a skull of a female and the jawbones of three individuals dating back to 16,500 years ago, were the earliest known human remains in the Philippines, until a metatarsal from the Callao Man discovered in 2007 was dated in 2010 by uranium-series dating as being 67,000 years old. However, some scientists think additional evidence is necessary to confirm those fossils as a new species, rather than a locally adapted population of other Homo populations, such as H. erectus or Denisovan.

The Tabon fragments are named after the Tabon Caves, where they were found on the west coast of Palawan. The cave complex appears to have been a kind of Stone Age factory, with both finished stone flake tools and waste core flakes having been found at four separate levels in the main chamber. Charcoal left from three assemblages of cooking fires there has been Carbon-14-dated to roughly 7000, 20,000, and 22,000 BCE. The right mandible of a Homo sapiens, which dates to 29,000 BC, was discovered together with a skullcap. The Tabon skull cap is considered the earliest skull cap of modern humans found in the Philippines, and is thought to have belonged to a young female. The Tabon mandible is the earliest evidence of human remains showing archaic characteristics of the mandible and teeth. The Tabon tibia fragment, a bone from the lower leg, was found during the re-excavation of the Tabon Cave complex by the National Museum of the Philippines. The bone was sent to the National Museum of Natural History in France to be studied.

The Tabon Cave complex is named after the "Tabon bird" (Tabon scrubfowl, Megapodius cumingii), which deposited thick hard layers of guano during periods when the cave was uninhabited, so that succeeding groups of tool-makers settled on a cement-like floor of bird dung. About half of the 3,000 recovered specimens examined were discarded cores of a material that had to have been transported from some distance. This indicates that the inhabitants were engaged in tool manufacture. The Tabon fossils are considered to have come from a third group of inhabitants, who worked the cave between 22,000 and 20,000 BCE. An earlier cave level lies so far below the level containing cooking fire assemblages that it must represent Upper Pleistocene dates such as 45,000 or 50,000 years ago. Anthropologist Robert Fox, who directed the excavations, deduced that the Tabon Cave complex was a habitation of humans for a period of 40,000 years, from 50,000 to 9,000 years ago.

Physical anthropologists who have examined the skullcap are agreed that she belonged to modern humans, Homo sapiens, as distinguished from the mid-Pleistocene Homo erectus species. This indicates that Tabon humans were pre-Mongoloid (Mongoloid being the term anthropologists apply to the populations who entered Southeast Asia during the Holocene and absorbed earlier peoples to produce the modern Malay, Indonesian, Filipino, and "Pacific" peoples). Two experts have given the opinion that the mandible is "Australian" in physical type and that the skullcap measurements are the closest to Ainu people or Tasmanians. Nothing can be concluded about the physical appearance of the individual from the recovered skull fragments except that she was not a Negrito.

Location 
The Tabon Cave Complex is a series of caves situated in a limestone promontory at Lipuun Point in Southwestern Palawan. It spans 138 hectares and it used to be an island, but now, a mangrove forest connects it to mainland Palawan. There are roughly 218 caves, 38 of which are rich with archaeological and anthropological finds. Lipton Point is made up of 25 million-year-old limestone and is composed of rocky large domes, deep cliffs, and steep hills. In this area, cave occupation of a sporadic or temporary nature by modern humans seems to be indicated in the early Holocene. In the earlier Holocene, several sites show more intensive or frequent occupation; local people appear to have been strongly focused on land-based, riverine, and estuarine resources; and in many cases, the sea is known to have been many kilometers away from the cave sites. In 1972, Presidential Proclamation No. 996 protected the Tabon Caves Complex and Lipuun point from deforestation and destruction. It was declared as a Site Museum Reservation under the administration of the National Museum and is preserved for the present and future generations.

Paleoenvironment 
The potential relationship between Tabon Cave travertine and pre-Late Glacial Maximum wetter climates sees some support from recent research on vegetation sequences in north Palawan. The Tabon Caves would have been far inland during the late Pleistocene, and Reynolds (1993) suggests that culturally, such caves would have been marginal during phases of low sea level, when currently submerged areas would have been the focus for human settlement.

Tabonian culture 
Stone tools, fossils, and earthenware have been found in different caves from the Tabon Caves Complex. In the Liyang Cave, large jars filled with human remains were discovered. That cave was believed to be a burial site of early humans. In the Tabon Cave, chert flakes and chopping tools, evidence of early humans being food gatherers and hunters, were found. Chert was readily available from the riverbanks near the caves. Early humans lived and knapped flake tools inside the Tabon Cave.

See also 
Homo luzonensis
 Timeline of Philippine history

Notes

References

Further reading

1962 archaeological discoveries
Upper Paleolithic Homo sapiens fossils
Archaeological discoveries in the Philippines
Paleontology in the Philippines
Prehistory of the Philippines